The Syringa Tree is a solo performance memory play of a childhood under apartheid, written and often performed by Pamela Gien, and directed by Larry Moss. It was produced by Matt Salinger, son of writer, J. D. Salinger.

It centers on the story of Elizabeth Grace, a Roman Catholic White South African of mixed English and Afrikaner descent. The play spans four generations.

Gien has adapted the play into a novel.

Production 
The play debuted in Seattle, WA. It later opened at the Playhouse 91 intimate theater in Yorkville, Manhattan in Fall 2000. The Manhattan reception was lukewarm at first, but news of Gien's performance soon garnered attention, drawing the interest of celebrities such as Oprah and Rosie O'Donnell.

It won an Obie Award for Best Play in 2001.

References

External links

American plays
Plays for one performer
Monodrama
2008 plays
Plays set in South Africa
Plays set in the 20th century
Plays about apartheid